Kopali (also spelled as Kapali) is a census town in the Chandil CD block in the Chandil subdivision of the Seraikela Kharsawan district in the Indian state of Jharkhand.

Geography

Location                                    

Jamshedpur Urban Agglomeration 
With its recognition as an industrial town as early as the 1911 census, Jamshedpur was set on the road of steady population growth, as large number of emigrants flocked in for work opportunities. While in the earlier decades the central nucleus grew, in the later decades towns around Jamshedpur grew rapidly. In 2011, Jamshedpur Urban Agglomeration included 13 urban centres, with a total population of 1.3 million people. However, in more recent years, Jamshedpur UA "has lacked the growth and development observed around other similar industrial towns in western and southern India." 

Note: The map alongside presents the Jamshedpur Urban Agglomeration. All places marked in the map are linked in the larger full screen map.

Civic administration  
There is a police outpost at Kapali.

Demographics 
According to the 2011 Census of India, Kopali had a total population of 43,256, of which 22,337 (52%) were males and 20,919 (48%) were females. Population in the age range 0-6 years was 7,603. The total number of literate persons in Kopali was 21,815 (72.40% of the population over 6 years). 

(*For language details see Chandil block#Language and religion) 

Jamshedpur Urban Agglomeration includes: Jamshedpur (Industrial Town), Jamshedpur (NAC), Tata Nagar Railway Colony (OG), Mango (NAC),  Jugsalai (M), Bagbera (CT), Chhota Gobindpur (CT), Haludbani (CT), Sarjamda (CT), Gadhra (CT), Ghorabandha (CT), Purihasa (CT), Adityapur (M Corp.), Chota Gamahria (CT) and Kapali (CT).

Infrastructure 
Among the civic amenities, it had  of roads with both closed and open drains, the protected water supply involved hand pump, tube well/ borewell, overhead tank. It had 6,351 domestic electric connections, 15 road lighting points. Among the medical facilities, it had 2 hospitals, 4 dispensaries, 4 health centres, 10 family welfare centres, 4 maternity and child welfare centres, 10 maternity homes, 2 nursing homes, 2 charitable hospital/ nursing homes, 10 veterinary hospitals, 5 medicine shops. It had 9 non-formal education centres (Sarva Shiksha Abhiyan). Among social, cultural and recreational facilities, it had 1 orphanage home, 2 auditorium/ community halls. Two important commodities it produced were ready-made clothes, furniture. It had the branch offices of 1 nationalised bank, 4 non-agricultural credit societies.

Education 
Merry English School at Kapali is an English-medium coeducational institution established in 2001. It has facilities for teaching from class I to class XII.

References 
 

 

Cities and towns in Seraikela Kharsawan district